Marie Foucher-Creteau (26 February 1925 – 17 January 2015) was a French swimmer. She competed in the women's 4 × 100 metre freestyle relay at the 1948 Summer Olympics.

References

External links
 

1925 births
2015 deaths
Olympic swimmers of France
Swimmers at the 1948 Summer Olympics
Place of birth missing
French female freestyle swimmers